David and Mary Kinne Farmstead is a historic home and farm complex located at Ovid in Seneca County, New York.  The complex consists of a Greek Revival style farmhouse and seven historic agricultural outbuildings.  By family tradition, the house is believed to have been built about 1850 and is believed to have been used as a stop on the Underground Railroad.  The outbuildings all date to the mid- to late-19th century and include an outhouse, machine shop, carriage house, horse barn, scale house, gambrel roof barn, and machine shed.

It was listed on the National Register of Historic Places in 2007.

References

Houses on the National Register of Historic Places in New York (state)
Houses completed in 1850
Houses in Seneca County, New York
Houses on the Underground Railroad
National Register of Historic Places in Seneca County, New York
Underground Railroad in New York (state)